Brissac-Quincé is a former commune of the Maine-et-Loire département, in France. It was created in 1964 from a regrouping of two former neighbouring communes, Brissac and Quincé. On 15 December 2016, Brissac-Quincé was merged into the new commune of Brissac Loire Aubance.

The French mathematician Charles-René Reynaud (1656–1728) was born in Brissac. The Château de Brissac is located in the commune.

Population

Twin towns
 Caluso, Italy

See also
Communes of the Maine-et-Loire department

References

Former communes of Maine-et-Loire